Potamotrygon tatianae, the Tatiana's river stingray, is a species of river stingray (Potamotrygonidae) endemic to the Madre de Dios River and upper Madeira River basins in Peru.

Description
This river stingray's oval disc is longer than wide (disc length between 102 and 131% of the disc width). The mouth is small, opening relatively straight across, and has two lateral and three central papillae. One of the central papillae is closer to the lower jaw tooth plate. The teeth are relatively small, with 36-46 rows in the upper jaw and 33‑45 in the lower jaw.

The background colour is generally blackish-brown with beige, light beige, or dark brown spots.

This species was named after Tatiana Raso de Moraes Possato, a late student of biology who was an enthusiastic researcher of chondrichthyans, in particular potamotrygonids.

The types are housed in Brazil at the Museum of Zoology of the University of São Paulo: MZUSP 107673; Paratype: MZUSP 107667; MZUSP 107668).

References
 Da Silva, J.P.C.B. & De Carvalho, M.R., 2011: A new species of Neotropical freshwater stingray of the genus Potamotrygon Garman, 1877 from the Río Madre de Díos, Peru (Chondrichthyes: Potamotrygonidae). Papéis Avulsos de Zoologia, 51 (8): 139-154.

External links
 Species Description of Potamotrygon tatianae at www.shark-references.com

tatianae
Endemic fauna of Peru
Freshwater fish of Peru
Fish described in 2011